Zhang Ling (born October 28, 1989), stylized as Lynn Zhang after retirement, is a former professional Chinese tennis player competing for Hong Kong.

On 12 September 2011, she reached her highest singles ranking by the Women's Tennis Association (WTA) of 184. On 22 June 2009, she also reached her highest WTA doubles ranking of 219. She won 14 singles titles and seven doubles titles on the ITF Women's Circuit.

In 2014, she had her first main-draw match win on the WTA Tour in Kuala Lumpur. She defeated Olga Savchuk, and become the first Hong Kongese player to achieve this, after Patricia Hy-Boulais done it in the 1980s.

Playing for Hong Kong at the Fed Cup, Ling has a win–loss record of 37–26. She is the Hong Kong player with most ties (44) and years (11) played, together with most singles, doubles and total wins, leading Hong Kong to play in Asia Group I for four times (2007, 2008, 2015, 2018).

Zhang announced her retirement from professional tennis in September 2020, after 16 years on the tour.

ITF Circuit finals

Singles: 26 (14 titles, 12 runner-ups)

Doubles: 15 (7 titles, 8 runner-ups)

References

External links
 
 
 

1989 births
Living people
Hong Kong female tennis players
Tennis players at the 2010 Asian Games
Tennis players at the 2014 Asian Games
Tennis players at the 2018 Asian Games
Tennis players from Hainan
Asian Games competitors for Hong Kong